ISO/TC 37 is a technical committee within the International Organization for Standardization (ISO) that prepares standards and other documents concerning methodology and principles for terminology and language resources.

Title: Terminology and other language and content resources

Scope: Standardization of principles, methods and applications relating to terminology and other language and content resources in the contexts of multilingual communication and cultural diversity

ISO/TC 37 is a so-called "horizontal committee", providing guidelines for all other technical committees that develop standards on how to manage their terminological problems. However, the standards developed by ISO/TC 37 are not restricted to ISO. Collaboration with industry is sought to ensure that the requirements and needs from all possible users of standards concerning terminology, language and structured content are duly and timely addressed.

Involvement in standards development is open to all stakeholders and requests can be made to the TC through any liaison or member organization (see the list of current members and liaisons of ISO/TC 37:)

ISO/TC 37 standards are therefore fundamental and should form the basis for many localization, translation, and other industry applications.

ISO/TC 37 "Terminology and other language and content resources"
International Standards are developed by experts from industry, academia and business who are delegates of their national standards institution or another organization in liaison. Involvement, therefore, is principally open to all stakeholders. They are based on consensus among those national standards institutes who collaborate in the respective committee by way of membership.

ISO/TC 37 develops International Standards concerning:
 terminological principles and methods
 vocabulary of terminology and language resource management
 terminology work
 preparation and management of language resources
 preparation and layout of terminology standards
 computerized terminography and lexicography
 terminology documentation
 coding and codes in the field of terminology and other language resources
 applications of terminology and other language resources in language engineering and content management
 translation, interpreting and related technology

ISO/TC 37 looks upon a long history of terminology unification activities. In the past, terminology experts - even more so experts of terminology theory and methodology - had to struggle for wide recognition. Today their expertise is sought in many application areas, especially in various fields of standardization. The emerging multilingual information society and knowledge society will depend on reliable digital content. Terminology is indispensable here. This is because terminology plays a crucial role wherever and whenever specialized information and knowledge is being prepared (e.g. in research and development), used (e.g. in specialized texts), recorded and processed (e.g. in data banks), passed on (via training and teaching), implemented (e.g. in technology and knowledge transfer), or translated and interpreted. In the age of globalization the need for methodology standards concerning multilingual digital content is increasing - ISO/TC 37 has developed over the years the expertise for methodology standards for science and technology related content in textual form.

Terminology standardization
The beginnings of terminology standardization are closely linked to the standardization efforts of IEC (International Electrotechnical Commission, founded in 1906) and ISO (International Organization for Standardization, founded in 1946).

A terminology standard according to ISO/IEC Guide 2 (1996) is defined as "standard that is concerned with terms, usually accompanied by their definitions, and sometimes by explanatory notes, illustrations, examples, etc."

ISO 1087-1:2000 defines terminology as "set of designations belonging to one special language" and designations as "representation of a concept by a sign which denotes it". Here, concept representation goes beyond terms (being only linguistic signs), which is also supported by the state-of-the-art of terminology science, according to which terminology has three major functions:

 basic elements carrying meaning in domain communication,
 ordering of scientific-technical knowledge at the level of concepts,
 access to other representations of specialized information and knowledge.

The above indicates that terminological data (comprising various kinds of knowledge representation) possibly have a much more fundamental role in domain-related information and knowledge than commonly understood.

Today, terminology standardization can be subdivided into two distinct activities:
 standardization of terminologies,
 standardization of terminological principles and methods.

The two are mutually interdependent, since the standardization of terminologies would not result in high-quality terminological data, if certain common principles, rules and methods are not observed. On the other hand, these standardized terminological principles, rules and methods must reflect the state-of-the-art of theory and methodology development in those domains, in which terminological data have to be standardized in connection with the formulation of subject standards.

Terminology gained a special position in the field of standardization at large, which is defined as "activity of establishing, with regard to actual or potential problems, provisions for common and repeated use, aimed at the achievement of the optimum degree of order in a given context" (ISO/IEC 1996). Every technical committee or sub-committee or working group has to standardize subject matters, define and standardize its respective terminology. There is a consensus that terminology standardization precedes subject standardization (or "subject standardization requires terminology standardization").

History of ISO/TC 37
ISO/TC 37 was put into operation in 1952 in order "to find out and formulate general principles of terminology and terminological lexicography" (as terminography was called at that time).

The history of terminology standardization proper - if one excludes earlier attempts in the field of metrology - started in the International Electrotechnical Commission (IEC), which was founded in London in 1906 following a recommendation passed at the International Electrical Congress, held in St. Louis, United States, on 15 September 1904, to the extent that: "...steps should be taken to secure the co-operation of the technical societies of the world, by the appointment of a representative Commission to consider the question of the standardization of the nomenclature and ratings of electrical apparatus and machinery". From the very beginning, IEC considered it its foremost task to standardize the terminology of electrotechnology for the sake of the quality of its subject standards, and soon embarked upon the International Electrotechnical Vocabulary (IEV), whose first edition, based on many individual terminology standards, was published in 1938. The IEV is still being continued today, covering 77 chapters as parts of the International Standard series IEC 60050. The IEV Online Database can be accessed on Electropedia 

The predecessor to the International Organization for Standardization (ISO), the International Federation of Standardizing Associations (ISA, founded in 1926), made a similar experience. But it went a step further and - triggered by the publication of Eugen Wüster's book "Internationale Sprachnormung in der Technik" [International standardization of technical language] (Wüster 1931) - established in 1936 the Technical Committee ISA/TC 37 "Terminology" for the sake of formulating general principles and rules for terminology standardization.

ISA/TC 37 conceived a scheme of four classes of recommendations for terminology standardization mentioned below, but the Second World War interrupted its pioneering work. Nominally, ISO/TC 37 was established from the very beginning of ISO in 1946, but it was decided to re-activate it only in 1951 and the Committee started operation in 1952. Since then until 2009 the secretariat of ISO/TC 37 has been held by the International Information Centre for Terminology (Infoterm), on behalf of the Austrian Standards International Austria. Infoterm, an international non-governmental organization based in Austria, continues to collaborate as a twinning secretariat. After this the administration went to CNIS (China).

Objective of ISO/TC 37
To prepare standards specifying principles and methods for the preparation and management of language resources within the framework of standardization and related activities. Its technical work results in International Standards (and Technical Reports) covering terminological principles and methods as well as various aspects of computer-assisted terminography. ISO/TC 37 is not responsible for the co-ordination of the terminology standardizing activities of other ISO/TCs.

Structure of the committee
 ISO/TC 37/SC 1 (Principles and methods) 
 ISO/TC 37/SC 2 (Terminographical and lexicographical working methods) 
 ISO/TC 37/SC 3 (Systems to manage terminology, knowledge and content) 
 ISO/TC 37/SC 4 (Language resource management) 
 ISO/TC 37/SC 5 (Translation, interpreting and related technology)

Published Standards
ISO 639 Codes for the representation of names of languages, with the following parts:
 ISO 639-1:2002 Codes for the representation of names of languages —- Part 1: Alpha-2 code (ISO 639-1/RA - Registration Authority for the maintenance of the code: Infoterm [2])
 ISO 639-2:1998 Codes for the representation of names of languages —- Part 2: Alpha-3 code (ISO 639-2/RA - Registration Authority for the maintenance of the code: Library of Congress [3])
 ISO 639-3:2007 Codes for the representation of names of languages —- Part 3: Alpha-3 code for comprehensive coverage of languages (ISO 639-3/RA - Registration Authority for the maintenance of the code: SIL International)
 ISO 639-4:2010 Codes for the representation of names of languages—Part 4: General principles of coding of the representation of names of languages and related entities
 ISO 639-5:2008 Codes for the representation of names of languages —- Part 5: Alpha-3 code for language families and groups
 ISO 639-6:2009 Codes for the representation of names of languages—Part 6: Alpha-4 code for comprehensive coverage of language variants—Extension of coding for language
ISO 704:2009 Terminology work —- Principles and methods
ISO 860:1996 Terminology work —- Harmonization of concepts and terms
ISO 1087-1:2000 Terminology —- Vocabulary —- Part 1: Theory and application
ISO 1087-2:2000 Terminology work —- Vocabulary —- Part 2: Computer applications
ISO 1951:1997 Lexicographical symbols particularly for use in classified defining vocabularies
ISO 1951:2007 3rd Ed. -- Presentation/Representation of entries in dictionaries – Requirements, recommendations and information 
ISO 6156:1987 Magnetic tape exchange format for terminological / lexicographical records (MATER) (withdrawn)
ISO 10241:1992 Preparation and layout of international terminology standards
ISO 10241-1:2011 Terminological entries in standards – General requirements and examples of presentation
ISO 10241-2:2012 Terminological entries in standards – Part 2: Adoption of standardized *ISO 12199:2000 Alphabetical ordering of multilingual terminological and lexicographical data represented in the Latin alphabet
ISO 12200:1999 Computer applications in terminology —- Machine-readable terminology interchange format (MARTIF) —- Negotiated interchange
ISO 12615:2004 Bibliographic references and source identifiers for terminology work
ISO 12616:2002 Translation-oriented terminography
ISO 12620:1999 Computer applications in terminology —- Data categories obsoleted by ISO 12620:2009
ISO 12620:2009 Terminology and other language and content resources—Specification of data categories and management of a Data Category Registry for language resources
ISO 15188:2001 Project management guidelines for terminology standardization
ISO 16642:2003 Computer applications in terminology —- Terminology Mark-up Framework (TMF)
ISO 17100:2015 Translation Services-Requirements for Translation Services
ISO 22128:2008 Guide to terminology products and services – Overview and Guidance
ISO 23185:2009 Assessment and benchmarking of terminological resources – General concepts, principles and requirements
ISO 24613:2008 Language Resource Management - Lexical Markup-Framework (LMF)
ISO 30042:2008 Systems to manage terminology, knowledge and content—TermBase eXchange (TBX)

Standards and other ISO deliverables in preparation

ISO 639 family: Language coding

Other standards
Note: Current status is not mentioned here - see ISO Website for most recent status. Many of these are in development.:
 ISO 704 Terminology work - Principles and methods
 ISO 860.2 Terminology work - Harmonization of concepts & terms
 ISO 1087-1 Terminology work - Vocabulary - Part 1: Theory and application
 ISO 12618 Computer applications in terminology - Design, implementation and use of terminology management systems
 ISO 12620 Terminology and other content and language resources — Specification of data categories and management of a Data Category Registry for language resources
 ISO 21829 Language resource management - Terminology (TLM)
 ISO 22130 Additional language coding
 ISO 22134 Practical guide for socio-terminology
 ISO 22274 Internationalization and concept-related aspects of classification systems
 ISO 24156 Guidelines for applying concept modelling in terminology work
 ISO 24610-1 Language resource management - Feature structures - Part 1: Feature structure representation
 ISO 24610-2 Language resource management - Feature structures - Part 2: Feature systems declaration (FSD)
 ISO 24611 Language resource management - Morpho-syntactic annotation framework
 ISO 24612 Language resource management - Linguistic Annotation Framework
 ISO 24614-1 Language resource management - Word Segmentation of Written Texts for Mono-lingual and Multi-lingual Information Processing - Part 1: General principles and methods
 ISO 24614-2 Language resource management - Word Segmentation of Written Texts for Mono-lingual and Multi-lingual Information Processing - Part 2: Word segmentation for Chinese, Japanese and Korean
 ISO 24615 Language resource management - Syntactic Annotation Framework (SynAF)
 ISO 24617-3 Language resource management - Named entities
 ISO 26162 Design, implementation and maintenance of terminology management systems
 ISO 29383 Terminology policies - Development and Implementation

References

External links
 ISO International Organization for Standardization
 ISO Online Browsing Platform
 ISO/TC 37/SC4 Language Resources Management
 ISO/TC 37 press kit
 International Information Centre for Terminology (Infoterm)
 Terminology Policy Section
 World Language Documentation Centre
 The Terminology Blog (some general articles on terminology, standardization and related issues)
 ISO/TC 37 Annual Meetings 2007: Provo, Utah, United States
 ISO/TC 37 Annual Meetings 2008: Moscow, Russian Federation
 ISO/TC 37 Annual Meetings 2009: Bogotá, Colombia
 ISO/TC 37 Annual Meetings 2010: Dublin, Ireland
 ISO/TC 37 Annual Meetings 2016: Copenhagen, Denmark

Terminology
037
Technical specifications